Arthur Hadley may refer to:

 Arthur Twining Hadley (1856–1930), economist and president of Yale University
 Arthur Hadley (footballer) (1876–1963), English footballer